State Route 325 (SR 325) is a north–south state highway in the southeastern corner of the U.S. state of Ohio.

Route description

The segment of SR 325 between SR 141 and US 35 is part of the southern loop of the Welsh Scenic Byway, a  route in Gallia and Jackson counties that connects historic Welsh American communities, churches, cemeteries, and farms.

History

The intersection of SR 325 and SR 588 in Rio Grande was proposed to be converted to a roundabout in 2018; however, the project was canceled.

Major intersections

References

325
Transportation in Gallia County, Ohio
Transportation in Meigs County, Ohio